Eltham is a constituency created in 1983 and represented in the House of Commons of the UK Parliament since 1997 by Clive Efford of the Labour Party.

The seat approximately covers the southern half of the Royal Borough of Greenwich in London.

Boundaries

1983–1997: The London Borough of Greenwich wards of Avery Hill, Coldharbour, Deansfield, Eltham Park, Herbert, Middle Park, New Eltham, Nightingale, Palace, Sherard, Sutcliffe, Tarn, and Well Hall.

1997–2010: As above less Nightingale, plus Plumstead Common, Shrewsbury, and Slade.

2010–present: The London Borough of Greenwich wards of Coldharbour and New Eltham, Eltham North, Eltham South, Eltham West, Kidbrooke with Hornfair, Middle Park and Sutcliffe, and Shooters Hill.

The constituency is in the Royal Borough of Greenwich in south-east London. Before 1983, a constituency with similar boundaries was called Woolwich West.

The seat is bordered by the constituencies of:
Bromley and Chislehurst
Erith and Thamesmead
Greenwich and Woolwich
Lewisham East
Old Bexley and Sidcup

Constituency profile
The constituency is centred on Eltham which has a typical High Street shopping area, surrounded by 20th century suburbs such as Mottingham and New Eltham. There are two railway lines in the seat and many residents commute to Central London. Residents' health and wealth are around average for the UK.

Most central and southern wards have tended in local elections since 1997 to elect Conservative councillors whereas the other wards are inclined to Labour such as West Eltham.  The former areas have more owner-occupied houses and are more middle-class. Labour has fared well in the same period in the northern areas of the constituency towards Greenwich, and in areas such as Shooters Hill and Well Hall with the exception of the conservation area parts of Blackheath adding to one ward.

History
Summary of results
The 2015 result gave the seat the 28th-smallest majority of Labour's 232 seats by percentage of majority.

The seat was held by high-profile Tory Peter Bottomley from its inception in 1983. Bottomley had been the MP for abolished Woolwich West before 1983. Labour's Clive Efford gained the seat in 1997, the first Eltham election in which Bottomley did not stand. Bottomley was standing instead for Worthing West, where he has remained the MP ever since. After a further absolute majority in 2001, Efford's majority decreased in 2005; he resisted some national swing against the party in 2010 to hold the seat.

Opposition since 1997
Conservative and UKIP candidates won more than 5% of the vote in 2015 therefore kept their deposits.  Conservative Drury fell 6.2% short of winning the seat in 2015; in 2017, however, Efford more than doubled his margin to 6,296, Labour's largest majority in the seat since 1997.

First use of open primaries in London
In 2006, the Eltham Conservative Association became the first in London to select a prospective parliamentary candidate by means of an open primary election, where any voter on the electoral roll was entitled to attend and vote. David Gold (PPC Brighton Pavilion 2001) defeated Jackie Doyle-Price (PPC Sheffield Hillsborough 2005) and Eric Ollerenshaw (former London Assembly member), by winning more than 50% of the ballot in the first round at a meeting chaired by Michael Portillo on 31 July 2006 at the Bob Hope Theatre. Approximately 140 people attended the open primary.  Ironically while Gold was defeated in Eltham at the 2010 General Election, both Doyle-Price and Ollerenshaw won seats elsewhere.

Members of Parliament

Election results

Elections in the 2010s

Elections in the 2000s

Elections in the 1990s

Elections in the 1980s

See also
List of parliamentary constituencies in London
Politics of Greenwich
Royal Borough of Greenwich
Greenwich London Borough Council

Notes

References

External links
Eltham Labour Party
Eltham | Greenwich Conservatives
Politics Resources (Election results from 1922 onwards)
Electoral Calculus (Election results from 1955 onwards)

Politics of the Royal Borough of Greenwich
Parliamentary constituencies in London
Constituencies of the Parliament of the United Kingdom established in 1983
Eltham